This is a list of cricket grounds in Malaysia.  The grounds included in this list have held at least one first-class or List A match.  One of the grounds has also hosted One Day Internationals. Some of the venues included in this list were used as venues in the cricket competition during the 1998 Commonwealth Games.  All of the grounds in this list are within Klang Valley where the Malaysian capital of Kuala Lumpur is located.

References

External links
Cricket grounds in Malaysia at CricketArchive

Cricket grounds
Grounds
Malaysia